Marvel Classics Comics was an American comics magazine which ran from 1976 until 1978. It specialized in adaptations of literary classics such as Moby-Dick, The Three Musketeers, and The Iliad. It was Marvel Comics' attempt to pick up the mantle of Classics Illustrated, which stopped publishing in 1971. Thirty-six issues of Marvel Classics Comics were published, 12 of them being reprints of another publisher's work.

Overview 
Classics Illustrated, created by Albert Kanter, began publication in 1941 and finished its first run in 1971, producing 169 issues.  Editor Vincent Fago's Pendulum Now Age Classics, published by Pendulum Press, began adapting literary classics into black-and-white   comics beginning in 1973. The Pendulum series was the direct antecedent to Marvel Classics Comics — in fact, the Marvel series' first 12 issues were colorized reprints of selected Pendulum comics, with new covers. These issues featured writers like Otto Binder, Kin Platt, and Irwin Shapiro doing the adaptations; with art by Filipino artists Alex Niño, Rudy Nebres, and E. R. Cruz, among others.

Issues in the Marvel Classics Comics series were 52 pages with no advertisements. Most of the titles in the series had previously been adapted in Classics Illustrated, but two new ones were added: Bram Stoker's Dracula (#9, a Pendulum Press reprint) and H. Rider Haggard's She (#24).

After the first 12 reprint issues, adaptations were handled by writers like Doug Moench and John Warner (Warner was the series editor from issue #13–24). Many issues were drawn by Dino Castrillo; artists like Jess Jodloman, Yong Montaño, and Rudy Mesina also had multiple contributions. Ernie Chan was in charge of most of the early covers. Michael Golden's first work for Marvel Comics was "The Cask of Amontillado", a backup story in Marvel Classics Comics #28 (1977) adapting an Edgar Allan Poe short story.

In 1984, Marvel teamed with Fisher-Price to re-issue a selection of Marvel Classics Comics titles in toy stores, packaged with a cassette tape of the book.

In 2007, Marvel re-entered the literary adaptations arena with their imprint Marvel Illustrated.

Issue list

Original run (1976-1978) 
 Dr. Jekyll and Mr. Hyde, adapted by Kin Platt and Nestor Redondo
 The Time Machine, adapted by Otto Binder and Alex Niño
 The Hunchback of Notre-Dame, adapted by Naunerle Farr and Jun Lofamia
 Twenty Thousand Leagues Under the Sea, adapted by Otto Binder and Romy Gaboa & Ernie Patricio
 Black Beauty, adapted by Naunerle Farr and Rudy Nebres
 Gulliver's Travels, adapted by John Norwood Fago and E. R. Cruz
 Tom Sawyer, adapted by Irwin Shapiro and E. R. Cruz
 Moby-Dick, adapted by Irwin Shapiro and Alex Niño & Dan Adkins
 Dracula, adapted by Naunerle Farr and Nestor Redondo
 The Red Badge of Courage, adapted by Irwin Shapiro and E. R. Cruz
 The Mysterious Island, adapted by Otto Binder and E. R. Cruz
 The Three Musketeers, adapted by Naunerle Farr and Alex Niño
 The Last of the Mohicans
 The War of the Worlds
 Treasure Island, adapted by Bill Mantlo and Dino Castrillo 
 Ivanhoe
 The Count of Monte Cristo, adapted by Chris Claremont and Dino Castrillo
 The Odyssey
 Robinson Crusoe
 Frankenstein
 Master of the World, adapted by Doug Moench and Dino Castrillo
 Food of the Gods, adapted by Doug Moench and Sonny Trinidad 
 The Moonstone, adapted by Don McGregor and Dino Castrillo
 She, adapted by John Warner, Dino Castrillo & Rod Santiago
 The Invisible Man
 Iliad, adapted by Elliot S. Maggin and Yong Montano
 Kidnapped, adapted by Doug Moench, Pete Ijauco and Sonny Trinidad
 The Pit and the Pendulum, adapted by Doug Moench, Rudy Mesina, Yong Montano, Rod Santiago and Michael Golden
 The Prisoner of Zenda, adapted by Doug Moench and Rico Rival
 Arabian Nights, adapted by Doug Moench and Yong Montano
 The First Men in the Moon —  cover mistakenly attributes authorship of the original novel to Jules Verne
 White Fang
 The Prince and the Pauper
 Robin Hood
 Alice in Wonderland
 A Christmas Carol

Fisher-Price re-issue (1984) 
 Alice in Wonderland
 The Arabian Nights
 Frankenstein
 Robin Hood
 Robinson Crusoe
 Treasure Island

See also 
 Marvel Illustrated
 Classics Illustrated
 Graphic Classics
 Pendulum Press
 PAICO Classics — Indian series
 Classical Comics — British publisher
 SelfMadeHero — British publisher

References 

1976 comics debuts
1978 comics endings
Works based on The Count of Monte Cristo
Adaptations of works by H. G. Wells
Comics based on works by Jules Verne
Works based on The Adventures of Tom Sawyer
Adaptations of works by Robert Louis Stevenson
Adventure comics
Comics magazines published in the United States
Comics based on Dracula
Comics based on fiction
Comics based on novels
Comics based on poems
Comics by Don McGregor
Comics by Doug Moench
Defunct American comics
Fantasy comics
Horror comics
Magazines disestablished in 1978
Magazines established in 1976
Marvel Comics titles
Science fiction comics
Works based on The Hunchback of Notre-Dame
Monthly magazines published in the United States
Works based on the Iliad
Works based on the Odyssey
Comics based on works by Charles Dickens
Works based on A Christmas Carol